East Bay is a waterway in Kivalliq Region, Nunavut, Canada. It is located in Hudson Bay off eastern Southampton Island. Caribou Island lies to the north of the bay's mouth.

Geography
The habitat is characterized by tundra, sedge, grassy meadows, inlets, coastal marine features, rocky flats and barrens.

Fauna

East bay is a notable bird area. It is designated as a migratory bird sanctuary, Important Bird Area, and Key Migratory Bird Terrestrial Habitat.

References

Bays of Kivalliq Region